Nordlandsposten was a daily newspaper published in Bodø, Nordland, Norway.

History and profile
Nordlandsposten was first published in 1862. The paper had a conservative stance. In 2002 its circulation was 15,448 copies.

In autumn 2001, both Nordlands Framtid and Nordlandsposten were bought out by A-pressen and Harstad Tidende-gruppen in order to start a new newspaper in Bodø, which would join the two together. The new newspaper, Avisa Nordland, was first published on 18 February 2002.

References

1862 establishments in Norway
2002 establishments in Norway
Publications established in 1862
Publications disestablished in 2002
Defunct newspapers published in Norway
Daily newspapers published in Norway
Norwegian-language newspapers
Mass media in Nordland
Bodø